Savage Vengeance is a 1993 American rape and revenge film written and directed by Donald Farmer.

It stars Camille Keaton (under the alias "Vickie Kehl") as Jennifer, a reference to Keaton's earlier role as Jennifer Hills in I Spit on Your Grave. For this reason the film is often considered an unofficial sequel to that film.

Plot
A woman named Jennifer goes to a park where she is raped and left for dead by four men. Five years later, Jennifer, now in law school, is exposed by her law professor when he reveals to the class her past. She was tried for murder, but pleaded not guilty. Angry, she decides to take a little vacation with her friend, Sam.

When they stop for gas, Sam is harassed by a strange local man named Tommy, who had previously murdered a woman who spurned his advances at a bar. Tommy is brushed off by the gas station clerk Dwayne, who playfully flirts with Sam. When Jen and Sam arrive at their cabin, Sam is disgusted by the place and takes a walk. When night falls, she is lost but quickly finds a cottage. She is surprised to find out Dwayne owns the place. Dwayne attacks and rapes her before Tommy, who is revealed to be a friend of his, shows up and stabs her to death.

The next day, Jennifer goes back to the gas station looking for Sam. Instead, she is greeted by Dwayne and Tommy, who tell her they know where Sam is. After taking Jennifer to their cottage, they reveal Sam's corpse. Jennifer escapes the cottage and runs into the woods, but is caught by Dwayne. After Dwayne rapes her, Tommy then stabs her in the chest, leaving her for dead. Jennifer survives the ordeal, hitchhikes, and plans her revenge.

A little while later at the gas station, the sheriff questions Dwayne and Tommy about the missing women, but they deny everything. Dwayne is then told by a friend at a bar that a woman matching Jennifer's description recently bought weapons and has been asking about him around town. Dwayne later takes a walk in the woods and is attacked by Jennifer, who slices his head in half with a chainsaw. Meanwhile, Tommy is back at his cottage treating both Sam's and a woman's dead bodies as if they were alive. Jennifer chases him out of the cottage and shoots him in the groin with a shotgun and walks away, leaving Tommy to die in agony.

Cast
 Camille Keaton (credited as 'Vicki Kehl') as Jennifer
 Donald Farmer as Tommy
 Linda Lyer as Sam
 Phil Newman as Dwayne Chesney
 Jack Clout as Sheriff
 Robin Sinclair as Dr. Luna
 Jane Clark as Clerk
 Bill Sweeney as Manny
 Jack Kent as Bulldog
 Melissa Moore as Bar singer

Production
According to the director's commentary on the 2013 DVD release of the film, director Donald Farmer, met actress Camille Keaton while shooting his film, Cannibal Hookers, through a mutual friend. In 1988, Farmer was signed on as the casting director to the film No Justice and was in charge of finding celebrities to cast in the film. Farmer states he intended to put Keaton into as many films as possible. No Justice was shot in the spring of 1988 and Savage Vengeance was shot in the fall of 1988.

Farmer claims on a podcast, he pitched a film idea entitled Savage Vengeance to film producer Mel Lieberman of Lettuce Entertain U. The storyline would have involved Keaton's character as a detective cop who would kill criminals. Lieberman instead hired Farmer to write and direct what would be Savage Vengeance. The film's budget is estimated to be less than $6,000. It was shot in Tennessee on video.

Scream queen Melissa Moore made a cameo early in the film as a rock-pop singer performing at a bar; however, it was stock footage from a previous film by Farmer.

The film was completed and shelved for five years until Magnum Video approached Farmer to include two of his films in a Grave Dancer collection.

In 2013 a special edition DVD was released by Massacre Video, including a rare interview with actress Camille Keaton.

Remake
The film received a remake in 2020.

References

External links
 
 Savage Vengeance at Rotten Tomatoes (Wayback Machine)

1993 films
1993 crime thriller films
1993 horror films
1990s serial killer films
1990s vigilante films
American serial killer films
1993 independent films
1990s psychological thriller films
American crime thriller films
American sequel films
1990s exploitation films
American rape and revenge films
I Spit on Your Grave (film series)
1990s English-language films
1990s American films
Unofficial sequel films